James William Hince is an English guitarist, singer and songwriter, best known as the guitarist for the indie rock duo The Kills. He started his musical career in the bands Fiji, Scarfo, and Blyth Power. He co-founded The Kills with American singer Alison Mosshart in 2000. In The Kills, Hince is known as "Hotel".

In the early 2010s, Hince lost the use of one finger on his left hand following an accident of his hand being shut in a car door. He had to relearn how to play the guitar without it. In 2018, he was featured on Azealia Banks' song "Lorelei" from her second studio album, Fantasea II: The Second Wave.

Personal life
Hince grew up in Woolton Hill, Hampshire, England together with an older sister, Sarah. He attended Goldsmiths where he studied playwriting.

Hince was married to model Kate Moss. In 2008, The Sun reported that Hince and Moss became engaged during a trip to Amsterdam. Hince proposed to her in bed with a vintage 1920s ring worth more than £10,000. They married on 1 July 2011 at St Peter's Church, Southrop in Gloucestershire, and separated in July 2015. They divorced in 2016.

Discography

With Blyth Power
The Barman and Other Stories (1988)
Up From the Country (1988)
Goodbye to All That (1988)
Alnwick and Tyne (1990)
Better to Bat (1990)

With Scarfo
Scarfo (November 1995)
Luxury Plane Crash (July 1997)

With Fiji
"Cattlecount" (CD single) (August 1999)
Glue Hotel Tapes (mini album) (1999)
"Pillshop" (7" single)

Studio albums with The Kills
 Keep on Your Mean Side (2003)
 No Wow (2005)
 Midnight Boom (2008)
 Blood Pressures (2011)
 Ash & Ice (2016)

References

1968 births
English male singer-songwriters
English rock musicians
British male guitarists
Living people
Musicians from Buckinghamshire
People from East Woodhay